Toni Graham (born 1945) is an American fiction writer. She is a professor of English at Oklahoma State University; she also serves as editor and fiction editor for The Cimarron Review.

Biography
Graham earned an MFA in fiction writing from San Francisco State University. She has taught fiction writing at Oklahoma State University since 2000 and is Professor of English/Creative Writing. She has served as editor for the Cimarron Review since 2011 and as fiction editor from 2000 to the present.

Before being appointed to the faculty at Oklahoma State University, Graham taught creative writing at a number of California universities, including University of San Francisco; Santa Clara University; University of California, Santa Cruz; and Chico State.

Books
The Suicide Club: Stories, University of Georgia Press, (2015) 
Waiting for Elvis, Leapfrog Press, (2005) 
The Daiquiri Girls, University of Massachusetts Press, (1998)

Awards
Regents Distinguished Teaching Award, 2016
Flannery O'Connor Award for Short Fiction, 2014, for The Suicide Club.
John Gardner Book Award, 2006, for Waiting for Elvis
Grace Paley Award for Short Fiction, 1997, for The Daiquiri Girls

References

American fiction writers
American women writers
Flannery O'Connor Award for Short Fiction winners
Oklahoma State University faculty
San Francisco State University alumni
1945 births
Living people
American women academics
21st-century American women